Vilém Šindler (23 November 1903 – 10 May 1982) was a Czech middle-distance runner. He competed in both the 800 metres and the 1500 metres at the 1924 Summer Olympics and the 1928 Summer Olympics.

References

External links
 

1903 births
1982 deaths
Athletes (track and field) at the 1924 Summer Olympics
Athletes (track and field) at the 1928 Summer Olympics
Czech male sprinters
Czech male middle-distance runners
Olympic athletes of Czechoslovakia
People from Jindřichův Hradec District
Sportspeople from the South Bohemian Region